Pontiac is a census-designated place in southern Ozark County, Missouri, United States. It lies six miles south of Isabella and 18.5 miles southwest of Gainesville, on the northeast shore of Bull Shoals Lake.

A post office called Pontiac has been in operation since 1887.  The community was named in honor of the Ottawa Indian chief Pontiac, perhaps via Pontiac, Michigan.

The town is on a ridge above the lake at an elevation of about 820 feet. The lake has a normal surface elevation of 654 feet. The town consists of a post office, a marina and campgrounds on the lake, a restaurant, and a church. Pontiac is accessed via Missouri Route W from Missouri Route 5 south of Gainesville.

Demographics

References

Unincorporated communities in Ozark County, Missouri
Unincorporated communities in Missouri